Sirajganj-6 is a constituency represented in the Jatiya Sangsad (National Parliament) of Bangladesh since 2021 by Merina Jahan Kabita of the Awami League.

Boundaries
Sirajganj-6 constituency consists of Shahjadpur Upazila of Sirajganj district.

Members of Parliament

References

External links
 

Parliamentary constituencies in Bangladesh
Sirajganj District